The South African rand, or simply the rand, (sign: R; code: ZAR) is the official currency of the Southern African Common Monetary Area: South Africa, Namibia (alongside the Namibian dollar), Lesotho (alongside the Lesotho loti) and Eswatini (alongside the Swazi lilangeni). It is subdivided into 100 cents (sign: "c").

The South African rand is legal tender in the Common Monetary Area member states of Namibia, Lesotho and Eswatini, with these three countries also having their own national currency (the dollar, the loti and the lilangeni respectively) pegged with the rand at parity and still widely accepted as substitutes. The rand was also legal tender in Botswana until 1976, when the pula replaced the rand at par.

Etymology

The rand takes its name from the Witwatersrand ("white waters' ridge" in English, rand being the Dutch and Afrikaans word for 'ridge'), the ridge upon which Johannesburg is built and where most of South Africa's gold deposits were found. In English and Afrikaans the singular and plural form of the unit ("rand") is the same: one rand, ten rand, two million rand.

History

The rand was introduced in the Union of South Africa in 1961, three months before the country declared itself a republic. A Decimal Coinage Commission had been set up in 1956 to consider a move away from the denominations of pounds, shillings, and pence; it submitted its recommendations on 8 August 1958. It replaced the South African pound as legal tender, at the rate of 2 rand to 1 pound, or 10 shillings to the rand. The government introduced a mascot, Decimal Dan, "the rand-cent man" (known in Afrikaans as Daan Desimaal). This was accompanied by a radio jingle, to inform the public about the new currency.

Brief exchange rate history

1961–2000

One rand was worth US$1.40 (R0.72 per dollar) from the time of its inception in 1961 until late 1971, and the U.S. dollar became stronger than South African currency for the first time on 15 March 1982. Its value thereafter fluctuated as various exchange rate dispensations were implemented by the South African authorities. By the early 1980s, high inflation and mounting political pressure combined with sanctions placed against the country due to international opposition to the apartheid system had started to erode its value. The currency broke above parity with the dollar for the first time in March 1982, and continued to trade between R1 and R1.30 to the dollar until June 1984, when depreciation of the currency gained momentum. By February 1985, it was trading at over R2 per dollar, and in July that year, all foreign exchange trading was suspended for three days to try to stop the depreciation.

By the time that State President P. W. Botha made his Rubicon speech on 15 August 1985, it had weakened to R2.40 per dollar. The currency recovered somewhat between 1986 and 1988, trading near the R2 level most of the time and even breaking beneath it sporadically. The recovery was short-lived, however, and by the end of 1989, the rand was trading at more than R2.50 per dollar.

As it became clear in the early 1990s that the country was destined for Black majority rule and one reform after the other was announced, uncertainty about the future of the country hastened the depreciation until the level of R 3 to the dollar was breached in November 1992. A host of local and international events influenced the currency after that, most notably the 1994 general election, which had it weaken to over R3.60 to the dollar, the election of Tito Mboweni as the governor of the South African Reserve Bank, and the inauguration of President Thabo Mbeki in 1999, which had it quickly slide to over R6 to the dollar. The controversial land reform programme that was initiated in Zimbabwe, followed by the September 11, 2001 attacks, propelled it to its weakest historical level of R13.84 to the dollar in December 2001.

2001–2011

 
This sudden depreciation in 2001 led to a formal investigation, which in turn led to a dramatic recovery. By the end of 2002, the currency was trading under R9 to the dollar again, and by the end of 2004 was trading under R5.70 to the dollar. The currency softened somewhat in 2005, and was trading around R6.35 to the dollar at the end of the year. At the start of 2006, however, the currency resumed its rally, and as of 19 January 2006, was trading under R6 to the dollar again. However, during the second and third quarters of 2006 (i.e. April through September), the rand weakened significantly.

In sterling terms, it fell from around 9.5% to just over 7%, losing some 25% of its international trade-weighted value in just six months. In late 2007, the rand rallied modestly to just over 8%, only to experience a precipitous slide during the first quarter of 2008.

This downward slide could be attributed to a range of factors: South Africa's worsening current account deficit, which widened to a 36‑year high of 7.3% of gross domestic product (GDP) in 2007; inflation at a five-year high of just under 9%; escalating global risk aversion as investors' concerns over the spreading impact of the sub-prime crisis grew; and a general flight to "safe havens", away from the perceived risks of emerging markets. The rand depreciation was exacerbated by the Eskom electricity crisis, which arose from the utility being unable to meet the country's rapidly growing energy demands.

2012–present
A stalled mining industry in late 2012 led to new lows in early 2013. In late January 2014, the rand slid to R11.25 to the dollar, with analysts attributing the shift to "word from the US Federal Reserve that it would trim back stimulus spending, which led to a massive sell-off in emerging economies." In 2014, South Africa experienced its worst year against the US dollar since 2009, and in March 2015, the rand traded at its worst since 2002. At the time, Trading Economics released data that the rand "averaged R4.97 to the dollar between 1972–2015, reaching an all time high of R12.45 in December 2001 and a record low of R0.67 in June of 1973." By the end of 2014, the rand had weakened to R15.05 per dollar, partly due to South Africa's consistent trade account deficit with the rest of the world.
 
From 9–13 December 2015, over a four-day period, the rand dropped over 10% due to what some suspected was President Zuma's surprise announcement that he would be replacing the Finance Minister Nhlanhla Nene with the little-known David van Rooyen. The rapid drop in value was stemmed when Zuma backtracked and announced that the better-known previous Minister of Finance, Pravin Gordhan, would instead be appointed to the post. Zuma's surprise sacking of Nene damaged international confidence in the rand, and the exchange rate was volatile throughout much of January 2016, and reached an all-time low of R17.9169 to the US dollar on 9 January 2016 before rebounding to R16.57 later the same day.

The January drop in value was also partly caused by Japanese retail investors cutting their losses in the currency to look for higher-yield investments elsewhere and due to concerns over the impact of the economic slowdown in China, South Africa's largest export market.  By mid-January, economists were speculating that the rand could expect to see further volatility for the rest of 2016.
By 29 April, it reached its highest performance over the previous five months, exchanging at a rate of R14.16 to the United States dollar.

Following the United Kingdom voting to leave the European Union, the rand dropped in value over 8% against the US$ on 24 June 2016, the currency's largest single-day decline since the 2008 economic crash. This was partly due to a general global financial retreat from currencies seen as risky to the US dollar and partly due to concerns over how British withdrawal from the EU would impact the South African economy and trade relations.

In April 2017, a Reuters poll estimated that the rand would remain relatively stable for the rest of the year, as two polls found that analysts had already factored in a possible downgrade to "junk" status. At the time, Moody's rated South Africa two notches above junk status. When President Jacob Zuma narrowly won a motion of no confidence in South Africa in August 2017, the rand continued to slide, dropping 1.7% that day. In September 2017, Goldman Sachs said that the debt and corruption of Eskom Holdings was the biggest risk to South Africa's economy and the exchange rate of the rand. At the time, it had no permanent CEO, and Colin Coleman of Goldman Sachs in Africa said the company was "having discussions on solutions" on finding credible management. In October 2017, the rand firmed against the US dollar as it recovered from a six-month low. Reuters noted that "South Africa is highly susceptible to global investor sentiment as the country relies on foreign money to cover its large budget and current account deficits." On 13 November 2017, the rand fell by over 1% when the budget chief Michael Sachs stood down from his position in Zuma's administration.

In October 2022, the rand sank to its lowest point in two years, reaching R18.46 to the US dollar on 25 October 2022.

Coins

In 1965, 2 cent coins replaced the  cent coins. The  cent coin was last struck for circulation in 1973. The 1 rand coin for circulation was introduced in 1967, followed by 2-rand coins in 1989 and 5 rand coins in 1994. Production of the 1 and 2 cent coins was discontinued in 2002, followed by 5 cent coins in 2012, primarily due to inflation having devalued them, but they remain legal tender. Shops normally round the total purchase price of goods to the nearest 10 cents (in favour of the consumer).

In an effort to curb counterfeiting, a new 5-rand coin was released in August 2004. Security features introduced on the coin include a bimetal design (similar to the €1 and €2 coins, the Thai ฿10 coin, the pre-2018 Philippine ₱10 coin, the British £2 coin, and the Canadian $2 coin), a specially serrated security groove along the rim and microlettering.

Banknotes

The first series of rand banknotes was introduced in 1961 in denominations of 1, 2, 10, and 20 rand, with similar designs and colours to the preceding pound notes to ease the transition. They bore the image of what was believed at the time to be Jan van Riebeeck, the first V.O.C. administrator of Cape Town. It was later discovered that the image was not in fact Van Riebeeck at all, a portrait of Bartholomeus Vermuyden had been mistaken for Van Riebeeck. Like the last pound notes, they were printed in two variants, one with English written first and the other with Afrikaans written first.

In 1966, a second series was released with designs which moved away from the previous pound notes. Notes with denominations of 1, 5 and 10 rand were produced with predominantly one colour per note. A smaller 1 rand note with the same design was introduced in 1973 and a 2 rand note was introduced in 1974. The 20 rand denomination from the first series was dropped. All notes bore the image of Jan van Riebeeck. The practice of having an English and an Afrikaans version of each note was continued in this series.

The 1978 series began with denominations of 2, 5, 10 and 20 rand, with a 50 rand introduced in 1984. This series had only one language variant for each denomination of note. Afrikaans was the first language on the 2, 10, and 50 rand, while English was the first language on the 5 and 20 rand. The 1 rand note was replaced by a coin.

In the 1990s, the notes were redesigned with images of the Big Five wildlife species. 10, 20 and 50 rand notes were introduced in 1992 & 1993, retaining the colour scheme of the previous issue. Coins were introduced for the 2 and 5 rand, replacing the notes of the previous series, mainly because of the severe wear and tear experienced with low-denomination notes in circulation. In 1994, 100 and 200 rand notes were introduced.

The 2005 series has the same principal design, but with additional security features such as colour-shifting ink on the 50 rand and higher and the EURion constellation. The obverses of all denominations were printed in English, while two other official languages were printed on the reverse, thus making use of all 11 official languages of South Africa.

In 2010, the South African Reserve Bank and commercial banks withdrew all 1994 series 200-rand banknotes due to relatively high-quality counterfeit notes in circulation.

In 2011, the South African Reserve Bank issued 100 rand banknotes which were defective because they lacked fluorescent printing visible under UV light. In June, printing of this denomination was moved from the South African Bank Note Company to Crane Currency's Swedish division (Tumba Bruk), which reportedly produced 80 million 100 rand notes. The South African Reserve Bank shredded 3.6 million 100-rand banknotes printed by Crane Currency because they had the same serial numbers as a batch printed by the South African Bank Note Company. In addition, the notes printed in Sweden were not the correct colour, and they were 1 mm short.

On 11 February 2012, President Jacob Zuma announced that the country would be issuing a new set of banknotes bearing Nelson Mandela's image. They were entered into circulation on 6 November 2012. These contained the same denominations of 10, 20, 50, 100, and 200 rand.

In 2013, the 2012 series was updated with the addition of the EURion constellation to all five denominations.

On 18 July 2018, a special commemorative series of banknotes was released in commemoration of the 100th anniversary of Nelson Mandela's birth. This series includes notes of all denominations, 10, 20, 50, 100, and 200 rand. These notes will circulate alongside the existing notes. The notes depict the standard face of Nelson Mandela on the obverse, but instead of the Big Five animals on the reverse, they show a younger Mandela with different iconic scenes relating to his legacy. These scenes comprise: the rolling hills of the Eastern Cape, featuring Mandela's humble birthplace of Mvezo (10 rand); the home of Mandela in Soweto, where he defined his political life alongside other struggle icons (20 rand); the site where Mandela was captured near Howick, following 17 months in hiding, where a monument to him has been erected (50 rand); the place of Mandela's 27-year imprisonment at Robben Island, showing a pile of quarried limestone (100 rand); the statue of Mandela at the Union Buildings in remembrance of when he was inaugurated there in 1994 (200 rand).

First series

Second series

Third series

Fourth series

Fifth series

Sixth series

Seventh series

Exchange rate

See also
Financial rand
Witwatersrand
Krugerrand
Coins of the South African rand
South African pound
Economy of South Africa

Note

References

Further reading

External links
 Decimal Coinage (1962): Newsreel of South Africa's conversion to the Rand, British Pathé
South African Reserve Bank Currency Page 
 US Federal Reserve Bank historical exchange rate data
 South African Currency Page, with a short description of each note.
 South African Currency Page (old rand), a short description of pre-1994 (apartheid-era) notes.
 Historical banknotes of South Africa 
 Bank of England exchange rate ZAR vs GBP since 2001 - present

Currencies introduced in 1961
1961 establishments in South Africa
Currencies of the Commonwealth of Nations
Currencies of South Africa
Currencies of Botswana
Currencies of Namibia
Currencies of Eswatini
Currencies of Zimbabwe
Currency symbols